Andrejs Paulāns-Kraskevičs (Latgalian: Andrivs Povulāns-Kraskevičs, 30 November 1896 – 29 November 1973) was a Latvian and Latgalian ceramicist. He is regarded as one of the greatest Latgalian ceramicists. In 1937, Paulāns was awarded with a Gold Medal at the Paris Exhibition.

Biography
Andrejs Paulāns-Kraskevičs was born at Šembeļi village in Silajāņi Parish, Russian Empire in 1896. He inherited the interest for pottery from his father Izidors. In 1915, he joined Latvian riflemen as the World War I was going on. Two years later, Paulāns returned home after being heavily wounded in head and shoulder. For his service, he was awarded with a Cross of St. George. Paulāns right eye was blinded for the rest of his life.

Since 1918, Paulāns worked in the workshop of his father. His name rose to fame in 30's, when his works were shown in exhibitions outside Latvia. First foreign exhibition with Paulāns works was in 1931 in Sèvres, France. He was awarded with a Gold Medal at the 1937 Paris Exhibition.

Paulāns died on 29 November 1973. He is buried in the Feimaņi cemetery.

Legacy
Paulāns remains one of the most influential ceramicists in the Latgalian ceramics history. In Rainis Museum in Jasmuiža are located the relocated workshop and kiln of Andrejs Paulāns. In 1986, Latgale Ceramics Studio in Rēzekne was renamed to Andrejs Paulāns Folk Applied Art Studio. One of the streets in the Latgalian town of Preiļi is named in honor of Paulāns.

Honors
 1937: Gold Medal at the 1937 Paris Exhibition
 1958: People's Artist of the Latvian SSR

References

External links 

 Works by Paulāns @ Latgale Culture History Museum

1896 births
1973 deaths
People from Preiļi Municipality
20th-century Latgalian ceramists
20th-century Latvian ceramists
Recipients of the Order of St. George